Tere Liye is a 2001 Indian Hindi-language coming of age film. The film was a box office failure.

Plot synopsis
The teenage children of various workers at a film studio form a music band and struggle to stick together in turbulent times.

Cast 
 Arjun Punj ... Aditya Verma
 Shilpa Sakhlani ... Ritu Malhotra
 Bhavna Pani ... Piya Anand / Piya Ranjit Bose
 Hiten Paintal ... Dev Prakash Tandon
 Sonali Khare ... Tara
 Neelu Kohli ... Hero's Mother
 Pankit Thakker ... Raghu
 Imran Ahmed Khan ... Super Star

Soundtrack

References

External links
 

2000s Hindi-language films
Films featuring songs by Pritam